Jack Chambers (born 10 October 1988) is a dancer, singer, actor and choreographer, from Brisbane, Australia. He is best known for winning the first season of So You Think You Can Dance Australia in 2008.

Early life
Chambers started dance lessons at Brisbane's Julie-Ann Lucas School of Dance at the age of three and continued there until he was 17. He combined this training with acting and singing studies.

Theatre
Chambers' career took off at the age of 10 when he was cast in his first professional musical, the stage production of The Sound of Music, playing Kurt Von Trapp at the Lyric Theatre in Brisbane. Jack was also part of the amateur theatre community in Brisbane from the age of ten, working with companies such as Ocean Theatre Company, Queensland Musical Theatre and Harvest Rain Theatre Company.

In 2009 Jack made the move to New York City, where he began teaching Jazz dance at the Joffrey Ballet School & Peridance Capezio Center, in Manhattan. Jack also had the opportunity to work with many choreographers including Emmy Nominated Brian Thomas in the commercial dance world of NYC and Broadway's Josh Prince, where he performed as a part of an ensemble of dancer/singer's at The Kennedy Center's Annual Spring Gala of 2010, hosted by Liza Minnelli and Ben Vereen.

After only working 18 months in NYC, Jack found himself being flown back to Australia as he was cast as the teen heartthrob, Link Larkin, in the Original Australian touring production of Hairspray. Which earned Jack a nomination for Best Performance in a Supporting Role in a Musical, at the Sydney Theatre Critics Awards.

2012 Jack joined the cast of Jason Gilkison's world renowned production Burn the Floor. Jack toured to Hong Kong, South Korea and Japan before heading to London for a 6th month season on the West End at the Shaftesbury Theatre.

Chambers returned to the Australian stage in 2016, to play Cosmo Brown in the national touring production of Singin' in the Rain. The cast also starred Adam Garcia, Gretel Scarlett & Erika Heynatz. Jack's performance of Cosmo, earned him 3 award nominations in Australia, 2 of which he won. A Helpmann Award nomination for Best Male Actor in a Supporting Role in a Musical, Winning a Green Room Award for Best Male in a Supporting Role & Winning the Australian Dance Award for Outstanding Achievement in Commercial Dance, Musicals or Physical Theatre.

TV
Chambers was crowned the first So You Think You Can Dance Australia winner in 2008.

Jack also made an appearance in the 2nd season of the show, dancing alongside Kate Wormald, in the Top 100 Week episode.

2014 saw Chambers back on the show, when he danced with 2nd season winner Talia Fowler, for Australian singer Tina Arena, promoting her New Single Reset All.

Choreography
From the age of 15, Chambers started choreographing and performing with the male tap group Raw Metal, which in 2010 became RAW Company.

Jack is now Artistic Director of RAW Company.

In 2007 he choreographed and performed in the company's production Project X at the Holland Dance Festival in The Hague and The Singapore Arts Festival.

In 2016 Jack choreographed and performed in the company's Off Broadway season of 'UNTAPPED', at the New Victory Theater in New York City.

'UNTAPPED' continued to entertain audiences, winning the title of Best Dance Act at the Adelaide Fringe Festival 2016.

RAW Company, as of 2016, is now also a Registered Training Organisation, offering courses in both Dance and Musical Theatre.

References

1988 births
Living people
People from Brisbane
Australian choreographers
So You Think You Can Dance winners
Australian male musical theatre actors
Australian dancers